Dakota County may refer to:
Dakota County, Minnesota in the Twin Cities Metropolitan Area of east-central Minnesota
Dakota County, Nebraska in northeastern Nebraska